WOBX (1530 kHz) is an AM radio station broadcasting a conservative talk format. Licensed to Wanchese, North Carolina, United States, it serves the Elizabeth City-Nags Head area.  The station is currently owned by East Carolina Radio, Inc.

This station originally signed on in 1970 as WOBR, and was the first radio station to sign on in the Outer Banks. Throughout the 1970s & early 1980s, the station had an adult contemporary format. By the mid-eighties it had gone to a country format. In the late 1980s, the station went to a religious format. On April 11, 2000, the calls were changed to WOBX.

The station began broadcasting at 11:45 a.m. on May 29, 1970, at its studio/transmitter site near Wanchese, N.C., with a power of 250 watts, licensed for daytime-only operation. The first manager was G. Chambers Williams, III.

External links

OBX
OBX